Constantin Fasolt (born 1951), is an influential historian and was the Karl J. Weintraub Emeritus Professor of Medieval and Early Modern European History at the University of Chicago, who specializes in the development and significance of historical thought.

Biography
Constantin Fasolt was born in Germany and attended the Beethoven-Gymnasium in Bonn from 1961 to 1969. After two years of military service, Fasolt enrolled at the University of Bonn to study philosophy and medieval history. He later studied with Kantian philosopher Dieter Henrich, Hans-Georg Gadamer, Michael Theunissen and Ernst Tugendhat at the University of Heidelberg. Fasolt was especially impressed by  Tugendhat, and later remarked that "if I had met him [Tugendhat] as my first teacher, I could have stayed in philosophy." However, by that time Fasolt had grown disillusioned with German universities, which he described as "overcrowded" and "undemanding," and had decided to pursue his academic career in the United States.

In 1975, Fasolt moved to the United States to enroll at Columbia University for graduate studies in medieval history under the supervision of John Mundy. In 1981, he graduated from Columbia, earning a Ph.D. with distinction. He taught there as a lecturer in history from 1981 to 1983.

In 1983 he moved to Chicago to take a position as an assistant professor of history at the University of Chicago. He was promoted to the rank of associate professor in 1990, and to professor in 1999.

He came to prominence at the University of Chicago through his ground-breaking work in conciliar theory (Council and Hierarchy) and historiography (The Limits of History). As an administrator, he has served as chairman of numerous academic committees at the university, culminating in his appointment as Master of the Social Sciences Collegiate Division (2005–2008).

He has been awarded grants from numerous organizations, including the John Simon Guggenheim Memorial Foundation, the Max-Planck-Institute, the Woodrow Wilson International Center for Scholars, the National Humanities Center, the American Council of Learned Societies, and the American Philosophical Society.

Bibliography

Books and edited books

Hermann Conring's New Discourse on the Roman-German Emperor. Ed. and trans. Constantin Fasolt. Medieval and Renaissance Texts and Studies, 282. Tempe, AZ: Arizona Center for Medieval and Renaissance Studies, 2005.
The Limits of History. Chicago: University of Chicago Press, 2004.
Council and Hierarchy: The Political Thought of William Durant the Younger. Cambridge Studies in Medieval Life and Thought, 4th series, ed. David Luscombe. Cambridge: Cambridge University Press, 1991.
General Editor of New Perspectives on the Past, a series of monographs founded by R. I. Moore in 1983 and published by Blackwell, Oxford. Books published since 1993: David Arnold, The Problem of Nature (1996); Ernest Gellner, Nations and Nationalism, 2nd edition (2006); Francis Oakley, Kingship (2006); William Ray, The Logic of Culture (2001); Bruce Trigger, Sociocultural Evolution (1998); David Turley, Slavery (2000); Merry Wiesner, Gender in History (2001).

Articles, chapters in books, and other published writings

"Recentering the West?" In Recent Themes in World History and the History of the West: Historians in Conversation, ed. Donald A. Yerxa, 98–103. Columbia, SC: University of South Carolina Press, 2009. Reprinted from Historically Speaking 9, no. 2 (Nov/Dec 2007): 14-16.
"Hegel's Ghost: Europe, the Reformation, and the Middle Ages." Viator 39 (2008): 345- 86.
"Religious Authority and Ecclesiastical Governance." In The Renaissance World, ed. John Jeffries Martin, 364–80. New York – London: Routledge, 2007.
"Recentering the West: A Forum," by John M. Headley, Sanjay Subrahmanyam, Constantin Fasolt, and John M. Hobson. Historically Speaking 9, no. 2 (Nov/Dec 2007): 9-19.
"Hermann Conring and the European History of Law." In Politics and Reformations: Histories and Reformations. Essays in Honor of Thomas A. Brady, Jr., ed. Christopher Ocker, Michael Printy, Peter Starenko, and Peter Wallace, 113–134. Studies in medieval and Reformation traditions, v. 127. Leiden: Brill, 2007.
"History and Religion in the Modern Age." History and Theory, Theme Issue 45 (2006): 10- 26.
"Red Herrings: Relativism, Objectivism, and Other False Dilemmas." Storia della storiografia 48 (2005): 17-26.
"Empire the Modern Way." Disquisitions on the Past & Present 13 (2005): 73-82.
"The Limits of History: An Exchange," by Constantin Fasolt, Allan Megill, and Gabrielle M. Spiegel. Historically Speaking 6, no. 5 (May/June 2005): 5-17.
"Political Unity and Religious Diversity: Hermann Conring's Confessional Writings and the Preface to Aristotle's Politics of 1637." In Confessionalization in Europe, 1555–1700: Essays in Honor and Memory of Bodo Nischan, ed. John M. Headley, Hans J. Hillerbrand, and Anthony J. Papalas, 319–45. Aldershot: Ashgate, 2004.
"Report on Enrollment and Teaching, 1996 to 2001," University of Chicago Record, August 15, 2002 37/1 (2002): 1-7
"Europäische Geschichte, zweiter Akt: Die Reformation." In Die deutsche Reformation zwischen Spätmittelalter und Früher Neuzeit, ed. Thomas A. Brady, 231–50. München: R. Oldenbourg, 2001.
"Hermann Conring and the Republic of Letters." In Die europäische Gelehrtenrepublik im Zeitalter des Konfessionalismus. The European Republic of Letters in the Age of Confessionalism, ed. Herbert Jaumann, 141–53. Wiesbaden: Harrassowitz, 2001.
"Author and Authenticity in Conring's New Discourse on the Roman-German Emperor: A Seventeenth-Century Case Study." Renaissance Quarterly 54 (2001): 188-220.
"Voluntarism and Conciliarism in the Work of Francis Oakley." History of Political Thought 22 (2001): 41-52.
"Sovereignty and Heresy." In Infinite Boundaries: Order, Disorder, and Reorder in Early Modern German Culture, ed. Max Reinhart, 381–91. Kirksville, Missouri: Sixteenth Century Essays & Studies, 1998.
"A Question of Right: Hermann Conring's 'New Discourse on the Roman-German Emperor'." Sixteenth Century Journal 28 (1997): 739-58.
"William Durant the Younger and Conciliar Theory." Journal of the History of Ideas 58 (1997): 385-402.
"Texts, Society, and Time, or: Why it Helps to Read Great Books." Published online by the Association for Core Texts and Courses and by Fathom
"William Durant the Younger in the History of the Conciliar Theory." In The Vital Nexus: Representation, Consent and Papal Authority, ed. Arthur P. Monahan and John R. MacCormack, 20–8. Halifax, Nova Scotia: Institute of Human Values, Saint Mary's University, 1996.
"Visions of Order in the Canonists and Civilians." In Handbook of European History, 1400- 1600: Late Middle Ages, Renaissance and Reformation, ed. Thomas A. Brady, Jr., Heiko Oberman, and James Tracy, 2:31-59. Leiden: Brill, 1995.
"Die Rezeption der Traktate des Wilhelm Durant d. J. im späten Mittelalter und in der frühen Neuzeit." In Das Publikum politischer Theorie im 14. Jahrhundert: Zu den Rezeptionsbedingungen politischer Philosophie im späteren Mittelalter, ed. Jürgen Miethke, 61–80. Munich: Oldenbourg, 1992.
"Quod omnes tangit ab omnibus approbari debet: The Words and the Meaning." In In Iure Veritas: Studies in Canon Law in Memory ofSchafer Williams, ed. Steven Bowman and Blanche Cody, 21–55. Cincinnati, Ohio: University of Cincinnati, College of Law, 1991.
"From Helmstedt via Mainz to Paris: Hermann Conring and Hugues de Lionne." In Proceedings of the Annual Meeting of the Western Society for French History, 16, ed. Gordon C. Bond, 126–34. Auburn: Western Society for French History, 1989.
"At the Crossroads of Law and Politics: William Durant the Younger's 'Treatise' on Councils." Bulletin of Medieval Canon Law n. s. 18 (1988): 43-53.
"Conring on History." In Supplementum Festivum: Studies in Honor of Paul Oskar Kristeller, ed. James Hankins, John Monfasani, and Frederick Purnell, 563–87. Binghamton, N.Y.: Medieval and Renaissance Texts and Studies, 1987.
Translation of Philippe Duplessis-Mornay, "Vindiciae contra Tyrannos." In Early Modern Europe: Crisis of Authority, ed. Eric Cochrane, Charles M. Gray, and Mark A. Kishlansky, trans. Constantin Fasolt, 103–37. University of Chicago Readings in Western Civilization, vol. 6. Chicago: University of Chicago Press, 1987.
Translation of sections 6, 15, 29, 45, 58, 59, 61, 62, 64, 65, 69. In Medieval Europe, ed. Julius Kirshner and Karl F. Morrison, trans. Constantin Fasolt, 55–66, 87–95, 164–9, 304–12, 360–7, 369–77, 383–402, 434–46. University of Chicago Readings in Western Civilization, vol. 4. Chicago: University of Chicago Press, 1986.
Revised Lists of Suggested Readings. In History of Western Civilization: A Handbook, by William H. McNeill. 6th ed. Chicago: University of Chicago Press, 1986.
"A New View of William Durant the Younger's 'Tractatus de modo generalis concilii celebrandi'." Traditio 37 (1981): 291-324.
"Die Erforschung von Wilhelm Durant d. J. 'Tractatus de modo generalis concilii celebrandi': Eine kritische Übersicht." Annuarium Historiae Conciliorum 12 (1980): 205-28.
"The Manuscripts and Editions of William Durant the Younger's 'Tractatus de modo generalis concilii celebrandi'." Annuarium Historiae Conciliorum 10 (1978): 290-309.

Fasolt  has also contributed reviews in the following journals: American Historical Review, Bryn Mawr Reviews, German History, Journal of Modern History, Renaissance Quarterly, and Sixteenth Century Journal.

References

External links
Constantin Fasolt's Home Page
"Start Here Now: Interview with Constantin Fasolt". Hansong Li, Paige Pendarvis. Chicago Journal of History, Spring 2016

1951 births
Living people
Historians of Europe
German expatriates in the United States
German medievalists
University of Bonn alumni
German male non-fiction writers